Castelo de Nisa is a castle in Portugal. It is classified as a National Monument.

Castles in Portugal
Castle Nisa
Buildings and structures in Nisa, Portugal